Amsterdamsche Football Club, known as AFC, is a football club from Amsterdam, Netherlands. It is currently playing in the Tweede Divisie, the third tier of football in the Netherlands.

History

19th century: Foundation 
AFC was founded in 1895 when a group of young Amsterdammers decided to create a football club. On 18 January 1895 the founding meeting took place in the basement of a house on the Koninginneweg where after a long discussion the name "Amsterdamsche Football Club (AFC)" was chosen. The meeting was held by six boys aged fifteen and sixteen. Four of them being Gerard Scheepens, Hein Brass, Frits Bernard and G.J. Bernard. These six boys were the progenitors of AFC.

20th century: Championships galore 
AFC-1 were crowned champions 13 times; 1906, 1909, 1917, 1918, 1919, 1946, 1961, 1963, 1967, 1969, 2001, 2010 and 2014, while also having been relegated three times; 1921, 1922 and 1998. In 2010 it was the first club in the Netherlands to enter the newly formed 'Top Class'. Despite only having 15 members when founded, by the time of the club's 50th anniversary (1945) it had over 700. By AFC's 100-year existence (1995) it has more than 1,500 members and in summer 2016 the club, including non-playing donors, over 2,100 members. Due to the shortage of fields and accommodation, unfortunately, hundreds of aspiring members must be disappointed every season when they apply for membership.

21st century: Tweede Divisie and Eerste Klasse 
In 2016 the first male squad lost 3–1 against Ajax U15. On 6 July 2017 it was announced that the squad's match against De Dijk in a qualifying round for the Dutch national cup had been postponed until 20 August.

Current squad
As of 12 November 2020

Associated people

Chief coaches – 20th century

Chief coaches – 21st century

Notable players 
 Daley Blind
 Brian Brobbey
 Carel Eiting
 Donald Feldmann
 Wim Feldmann
 Maxim Gullit
 Edwin Gyasi
 Ridgeciano Haps
 Mickey van der Hart
 Thom Haye
 Raily Ignacio
 Florian Jozefzoon
 Justin Kluivert
 Thomas Lam
 Derrick Luckassen
 Daryl van Mieghem
 Marcel Peeper
 Kenneth Pérez
 Immanuel Pherai
 Daniël de Ridder
 Philippe Sandler

References

External links
Official site

 
1895 establishments in the Netherlands
Association football clubs established in 1895
Football clubs in the Netherlands
Football clubs in Amsterdam